Gethin Jones (born 8 August 1981) is a Welsh footballer who plays for Cirencester Town on loan from Merthyr Town as a defender.

Football career

Cardiff City (2001–2003)
Born in Carmarthen, He played for Carmarthen Town FC. Cardiff City bought him for a fee around £50,000.  Jones began his professional footballing career at Cardiff City. He made three appearances in The Football League for Cardiff. Jones made his debut in the Football League Trophy Southern Section First Round in the 7–1 home win over Rushden & Diamonds on 15 October 2001, replacing Andy Thompson as a substitute in the 84th minute. However, he has a horrific injury, he broke his leg during a game and ended his Cardiff City career.

Merthyr Tydfil (2003–2005)
Jones made his first appearance for Merthyr Tydfil, in the Southern Football League Premier Division in August 2003 against Chesham United. He played for two years at Merthyr Tydfil.

Bath City (2005–2013)
Jones joined Bath City in the summer of 2005. He has played over two hundred times for the club.

References

External links
 Bath City official profile
 

1981 births
Living people
Sportspeople from Carmarthen
Welsh footballers
Association football defenders
Cardiff City F.C. players
Merthyr Tydfil F.C. players
Bath City F.C. players
English Football League players